Tan Siliang, also known as Eric Tan, is a Chinese billionaire businessman, the chairman and co-founder of Qutoutiao, a mobile content aggregator.

Early life
Tan earned a bachelor of engineering degree in automation from Tsinghua University in 2002, and a master of engineering degree in artificial intelligence from the University of Chinese Academy of Sciences in 2006.

Career
Tan worked for Yahoo China as a senior engineer.

Qutoutiao was founded in 2016, and is based in Shanghai. In September 2018, following Qutoutiao's IPO, Tan's net worth was estimated at US$1.7 billion.

References

Living people
Billionaires from Shanghai
Chinese technology company founders
Yahoo! people
Tsinghua University alumni
Year of birth missing (living people)
University of the Chinese Academy of Sciences alumni